Valeri Nikolayevich Masalitin (born 27 September 1966) is a former Russian professional footballer.

Club career
He made his debut in the Soviet Second League in 1983 for FC Salyut Belgorod.

He scored 5 goals in one game, which is a joint record of the Soviet Top League (in 1990 for PFC CSKA Moscow in a game against FC Rotor Volgograd).

Honours
 Soviet Top League champion: 1991.
 Soviet Top League runner-up: 1990.
 Soviet Cup winner: 1991.
 Soviet Cup finalist: 1992.
 Russian Cup winner: 1994.
 Russian Cup finalist: 1993, 1994 (played in the early stages of the 1993/94 tournament for PFC CSKA Moscow who lost in the final to FC Spartak Moscow, his team at the time).
 Russian Premier League champion: 1994.
 Russian Premier League bronze: 1995.
 Turkmenistan Higher League champion: 1998.

European club competitions
 European Cup Winners' Cup 1991–92 for PFC CSKA Moscow: 2 games.
 UEFA Champions League 1993–94 with FC Spartak Moscow: 1 game.

References

1966 births
People from Belgorod
Living people
Soviet footballers
Russian footballers
Association football forwards
Soviet expatriate footballers
Russian expatriate footballers
Expatriate footballers in the Netherlands
Expatriate footballers in Czechoslovakia
Expatriate footballers in Turkmenistan
Soviet Top League players
Russian Premier League players
Eredivisie players
FC Salyut Belgorod players
FC SKA Rostov-on-Don players
PFC CSKA Moscow players
SBV Vitesse players
K. Beerschot V.A.C. players
FK Köpetdag Aşgabat players
SK Sigma Olomouc players
CD Badajoz players
FC Spartak Moscow players
FC Chernomorets Novorossiysk players
FC Akhmat Grozny players
Sportspeople from Belgorod Oblast